John R. Petrus (October 23, 1923 - October 2, 2013) was an American politician who was a member of the Wisconsin State Assembly.

Biography
Petrus was born in Walsenburg, Colorado. He graduated from the University of Wisconsin-Madison.

Career
Petrus was elected to the Assembly in 1952. He was a Republican.

References

People from Walsenburg, Colorado
University of Wisconsin–Madison alumni
1923 births
1983 deaths
20th-century American politicians
Republican Party members of the Wisconsin State Assembly